Gastón Nicolás Vitancurt Evora (born 26 February 1997) is a Uruguayan footballer who plays as a midfielder for Juventud de Las Piedras in the Uruguayan Primera División.

References

External links

1997 births
Living people
Montevideo City Torque players
Juventud de Las Piedras players
Uruguayan Primera División players
Uruguayan footballers
Association football midfielders
People from Maldonado Department